Allīnūs or Alīnūs was an Alexandrian philosopher and commentator on Aristotle from the sixth or seventh century AD. He wrote in Greek, but is known only from Arabic sources, including some translated excerpts of his works.

Life
Allīnūs was a Greek from Alexandria. Ibn Abī Uṣaybiʿa calls him al-Iskandarānī, 'the Alexandrian', and al-Qifṭī, in his commentary on the Kitāb al-Fihrist of Ibn al-Nadīm, qualifies him as a "Byzantine". Since he commented on the writings of Porphyry, he must have lived no earlier than the fourth century AD, most probably in the sixth or seventh. According to both Ibn al-Khammār and Ibn al-Ṭayyib, he belonged to a "group of Alexandrian philosophers" that followed John Philoponus and Olympiodorus the Younger. Probably, like the philosopher Elias, he was a pupil of Olympiodorus.

The Greek name of Allīnūs is not known and the Arabic spelling varies in the manuscripts. There are at least six variants. It has been suggested that the name is Aelianus, Albinus, Apollonius or Elias. An identification with the philosopher Elias has been ruled out. A possible identification is with the Apollonius of Alexandria cited by Simplicius of Cilicia in his commentary on the Categories, but nothing is known about this Apollonius, including when he lived.

Works
Fragments of Allīnūs commentaries or citations of them are found in several works. In total, there are eighteen surviving excerpts, either verbatim quotations or paraphrases, attributed to Allīnūs. In addition, there are four sayings of Allīnūs collected in the Ṣiwān al-ḥikmah of Abū Sulaymān al-Manṭiqī al-Sijistānī. All excerpts and sayings have been translated into English by Franz Rosenthal.

Commentaries
According to al-Qifṭī, Allīnūs wrote commentaries on the "four books" of logic, which means Aristotle's Categories, Hermeneutics and Prior Analytics and Porphyry's Isagoge.

Ibn al-Khammār was an admirer of Allīnūs. Ibn Abī Uṣaybiʿa writes that he saw, in a list of Ibn al-Khammār's works in his own handwriting, a translation from Syriac into Arabic of a work by Allīnūs entitled Arrangement of the Isagoge and the Categories. Ibn al-Khammār not only translated the commentary, but also provided his own commentary on the Arrangement in the form of marginal notes. In his course on the Categories, Ibn al-Khammār used the Arabic translation of Yaḥyā ibn ʿAdī, but it is most likely he relied on the commentary of Allīnūs.

Ibn al-Maṭrān cites both Allīnūs's commentaries on the Isagoge and the Categories. Ibn al-Ṭayyib also cites Allīnūs in his own commentaries on the Isagoge and the Categories. According to Ibn Riḍwān, Allīnūs criticized Aristotle in his comments on the fifth section of the Hermeneutics. Three quotations from Allīnūs are found in the Kitāb al-Saʿdāh wa-l-isʿād of Abu ʾl-Ḥasan ibn Abī Dharr. The manuscript Paris, Bibliothèque nationale de France, Ar. 2346, a copy of Ibn al-Khammār, contains marginal glosses by Allīnūs that seem to come from a different work than the Arrangement. Several further glosses either quoting or paraphrasing Allīnūs are included in the Arabic critical editions of Aristotle and the Isagoge by the Egyptian philosophers ʿAbd al-Raḥmān Badawī and Aḥmad Fuʾād al-Ahwānī, respectively.

Sayings
Of the four sayings attributed in the Ṣiwān to Allīnūs, one is an apocryphal saying attributed by Philostratus to Apollonius of Tyana. This strengthens the view that Allīnūs's Greek name was Apollonius. The other sayings attributed to Allīnūs are:
He was asked, "Why are you always sceptical?" He replied, "For the defence of certainty."
He said: I wonder how a weak lamp between four violent winds can remain.
This is glossed by the Ṣiwān with "That is, the soul in its relation to those four elements."
He said: There are four fires: A fire that eats and drinks—the fire of the stomach. A fire that eats but does not drink—the fire of fuel. A fire that drinks but does not eat—the fire of trees. And a fire that neither eats nor drinks—the fire of stones.

Notes

Bibliography

People from Alexandria
Ancient Roman philosophers
6th-century philosophers
Commentators on Aristotle